Arthur Gatter (1940 – December 12, 1990), nicknamed The Hammer-Killer of Frankfurt, was a German serial killer who killed six homeless people and two homosexuals in the city parks in 1990.

Murders 
The murders occurred from February 1 to May 22, 1990, in the outskirts of Frankfurt. Frankfurt at the time had around 2,400 homeless staying in the city and especially in the greener areas.

 February 2, 1990: a crime scene was found in Weißfrauenstraße. A security guard found the homeless 43-year-old Hans-Peter "Peterchen" S. at 5:00 AM.
 February 7, 1990: Another victim, 22-year-old Kurt Helmut H. was found with fatal head injuries. He was not a homeless person, therefore initially no connection to the first victim was established.
 April 2, 1990: At the bus stop at Rechneigrabenstraße. At 5:40, the tramp Helmut R. was found with severe head injuries which lead to his violent death. 
 April 3, 1990: Two victims were killed near the Eschenheimer plant. The police reached to this and founded the special operation "Berber" under Commissioner Karlheinz Wagner, and measures were taken. For example, dolls were draped as potential victims on park benches and plainclothed officers were to lure the offender as "decoys".
 April 9, 1990: Helmut R. was murdered in Ostzeil.
 April 11, 1990: A homeless man said he saw a man approach a sleeping person with a blunt object. After a facial composite was made, a suspect was arrested in Gallus, but had to be released due to lack of evidence.
 May 4, 1990: 46-year-old Hans-Peter M.'s bloody corpse was found around 7:30.
 May 5, 1990: 60-year-old Engelbert G. and 42-year-old Nicola Z. died about 50 meters apart. A crime scene photo with a bloodstained park bench visualised the brutality of the act. This meant that three homeless people had been murdered within 24 hours.

The police tried with surveillance technology (including stealth cameras in bird houses) to catch the culprit red-handed. However, the diffused parking lights and the inadequate camera technology were not enough to attract investigation-relevant images. Even a survey of dry-cleaning companies on whether blood-stained clothing has been delivered, provided no results. In the homeless scene, the fear was reversed and the city put up additional shelters and left the subway stops open overnight, so that as few people as possible had to sleep on park benches.

May 20, 1990: Brazilian native Anderson S. followed a man into a bush, supposedly to have sex with him. However, he was instead stabbed but managed to survive. The badly-injured man fled and collapsed on a park bench, where he was subsequently killed by the murderer.
May 22, 1990: Heinrich O. became the Hammer-Killer's last victim. A local resident had witnessed the incident and alerted the police. Only 12 minutes after the murder, a suspect was arrested.

Modus operandi 
On May 22, 1990, Arthur Gatter was arrested in connection to the hammer murders. As the supposed murder weapon a metalwork hammer was secured, which he carried hidden in a plastic bag in the armpit. Through this instrument, the typical impression fractures or perforated structures in the skull came about, as determined in forensic medicine. He systematically searched for victims on park benches and surprised them in their sleep. He watched them for a while, until he was sure he could do his job safely. For sneaking purposes he wore low-noise rubber gloves. He hit with so much force that the blood splashed meter-wide.

Life 
Arthur Gatter was a professional electrician by profession who lived in Australia for a while. After returning to Germany, he worked on assembly and traveled to countries in the Orient. Since the 1980s, he was no longer able to work and trashed his apartment in Wilhelm-Leuschner-Straße. It is believed that his schizophrenia was already greatly advanced at this time. Even in his next residence in Bornheim, he behaved suspiciously. Partly he had to be examined in a clinic for psychiatry and psychotherapy in Haina. A psychiatric report which was made at the time attested him an insanity defense. Before he could be taken to court, on December 12, 1990, Gatter hanged himself with a gauze bandage.

Psychogram of the offender 
Arthur Gatter grew up as a loner and already suffered in the early stages of anxiety and mental health problems, which expanded into a paranoid schizophrenia. By the late 1980s, a bizarre world of madness took over his thinking and acting. He told the police that a dark force had taken his victims to the park to be killed by him. Since 1987, he is said to have heard voices that dominated his life from then on. During the crime scene, Gatter made gurgling noises and mannerisms that are typical of certain mental illnesses. He said to have felt no remorse for his crimes or his victims.

See also
List of German serial killers

External links 
Trail of the culprit, The Hammer Killer, MDR, March 23, 2016

References 

1940 births
1990 murders in Germany
1990 suicides
Criminals from Hesse
German serial killers
Male serial killers
People from Ravensburg
People with schizophrenia
Serial killers who committed suicide in prison custody
Suicides by hanging in Germany
Violence against gay men
Violence against men in Europe